The Clinical Journal of Oncology Nursing is a bimonthly peer-reviewed nursing journal covering oncology nursing. It was established in 1997 and is published by the Oncology Nursing Society. The editor-in-chief is Ellen Carr.

Abstracting and indexing 
The journal is abstracted and indexed in CINAHL, MEDLINE/PubMed, EBSCO Health Source: Nursing/Academic Edition, PsycINFO, ProQuest Nursing and Allied Health Source, Science Citation Index Expanded, Social Sciences Citation Index, and Current Contents/Social & Behavioral Sciences. According to the Journal Citation Reports, the journal has a 2019 impact factor of 1.224.

References

External links 
 

Bimonthly journals
Academic journals published by learned and professional societies
English-language journals
Publications established in 1997
Oncology nursing journals